O.K. Chinnaraj is an Indian politician. He has won the Tamil Nadu Legislative Assembly elections 2006,2011 and 2016 from the Mettupalayam constituency. 
Chinnaraj, who is a member of the All India Anna Dravida Munnetra Kazhagam party, was first elected from the Mettupalayam constituency to the Tamil Legislative Assembly in 2006 and was re-elected in the elections of 2011 and 2016.

Elections contested

References 

Tamil Nadu MLAs 2006–2011
Tamil Nadu MLAs 2011–2016
All India Anna Dravida Munnetra Kazhagam politicians
Living people
Tamil Nadu MLAs 2016–2021
Year of birth missing (living people)
Tamil Nadu politicians